Confluenze - Rivista di studi iberomericani is a peer-reviewed open access academic journal established in 2009. It is published by the Department of Foreign Languages and Literatures (section of Iberian Studies) of the University of Bologna. It covers Ibero-American studies in the humanities and social sciences. The journal is published in Spanish, Italian and Portuguese, and it is diffused especially in Italy and Latin America.

In 2012, the journal acquired class A status in the evaluation lists published by the "National Agency for the Evaluation of Universities and Research Institutes".

It is maintained by AlmaDL, digital library of the University of Bologna.

Abstracting and indexing 
The journal is abstracted and indexed by LatinIndex and Modern Language Association, as well as other databases.

References

External links 
 

Latin American studies journals
Creative Commons Attribution-licensed journals
Publications established in 2009
Biannual journals
Multilingual journals
University of Bologna
Italian-language journals
Mass media in Bologna